Cointet may refer to:

People with the surname
Guy de Cointet (1934–1983), French artist
Jean-Paul Cointet, French historian
Michèle Cointet, French historian

Other
Cointet-element